Asma Zerin Jhumu is a Bangladesh Awami League politician and the former Member of Parliament from a reserved seat.

Career
Jhumu was elected to parliament from reserved seat as a Bangladesh Awami League candidate in 2008. She was the Organisational Secretary of Bangladesh Mohila Awami League.

References

Awami League politicians
Living people
Women members of the Jatiya Sangsad
9th Jatiya Sangsad members
21st-century Bangladeshi women politicians
21st-century Bangladeshi politicians
Year of birth missing (living people)